The Minister for Industry, Energy and Technology of Greece was the government minister responsible for the running of the Ministry for Industry, Energy and Technology.

The ministry started off as the Ministry for Industry, subsequently the Ministry for Industry and Energy. In 1982 it was split into the Ministry for Energy and Natural Resources and the Ministry for Research and Technology and in 1985 these two ministries merged again into the Ministry for Industry, Energy and Technology.

The ministry was merged into the Ministry of Development by the 1996 Panhellenic Socialist Movement (PASOK) administration.

Ministers for Industry (1974–1976)

Ministers for Industry and Energy (1977–1982)

 On July 5, 1982, the Ministry for Industry and Energy was split into two new ministries, the Ministry for Energy and Natural Resources and the Ministry for Research and Technology.

Ministers for Energy and Natural Resources (1982–1985)

Minister for Research and Technology (1982–1985)

 On July 26, 1985, the Ministry for Energy and Natural Resources and the Ministry for Research and Technology merged to form the Ministry for Industry, Energy and Technology.

Ministers for Industry, Energy and Technology (1985–1996)

 From August 8, 1991 until September 15, 1995 the Minister for Industry, Energy and Technology was also Minister for Trade.
 From February 1, 1996, the Ministry for Industry, Energy and Technology was merged with the Ministry for Trade and the Ministry for Tourism to create the Ministry for Development.

See also
 Cabinet of Greece

Government of Greece
Lists of government ministers of Greece
Defunct government ministries of Greece